Macrocallista maculata, or the calico clam, is a species of bivalve mollusc in the family Veneridae. It can be found along the Atlantic coast of North America, ranging from North Carolina to Bermuda and Brazil.

The calico clam has been protected from harvesting in Bermuda since the 1970s (see Fisheries Protected Species Order 1978).

References

Veneridae
Molluscs described in 1758
Taxa named by Carl Linnaeus